Flying Passion (Shoghe Parvaz) is an Iranian Drama series. The series is directed by Yadollah Samadi.

Storyline 
The story of Flying Passion series is make about the life of Abbas Babaei, one of the pilots of the Iranian Air Force.

Cast 
 Shahab Hosseini
 Shahram Haghighat Doost
 Elham Hamidi
 Afsaneh Bayegan
 Farhad Ghaemian
 Setareh Eskandari
 Akbar Abdi
 Abbas Amiri Moghaddam
 Mehran Rajabi
 Mina Jafarzadeh
 Ali Salehi
 Hassan Joharchi
 Akram Mohammadi
 Abdolreza Akbari
 Kourosh Tahami
 Atabak Naderi
 Behzad Rahimkhani
 Mehdi Faghiheh
 Zohreh Hamidi
 Mohsen Afshani
 Mehrdad Ziaei
 Parisa Roshani
 Abbas Amiri
 Anna Barzina
 Behnaz Soleimani

References

External links
 

Iranian television series
2010s Iranian television series